Giovanni "Gianni" Di Marzio (8 January 1940 – 22 January 2022) was an Italian professional football manager.

Career
After leaving his footballer career for an injury, he debuted as a manager in 1968 in Serie C. He had his breakout as the coach of Catanzaro, where after his second season in charge, led the team to an unexpected promotion to Serie A in 1976. The team then finished 15th in only their second ever Serie A campaign and were automatically relegated. Di Marzio had shown enough to earn a move to Napoli for the following season.  

With Napoli he was a Coppa Italia finalist in 1978, losing the trophy against Inter Milan. In 1983 he brought Catania in Serie A, and in 1988 Cosenza in Serie B. He retired from management after failing to rescue Palermo from relegation in 1992.

Di Marzio successively took on a career as a football pundit and manager, working as Maurizio Zamparini's collaborator during his periods at Venezia and Palermo, as well as transfer consultant and scout at Queens Park Rangers.

Managerial statistics

Personal life
Di Marzio's son, Gianluca, is a renowned Italian football journalist and pundit, working with Sky Italia.

Death
He died in Padua on 22 January 2022, at the age of 82.

References

1940 births
2022 deaths
Footballers from Naples
S.S. Juve Stabia players
Italian football managers
A.S.G. Nocerina managers
S.S. Juve Stabia managers
U.S. Catanzaro 1929 managers
S.S.C. Napoli managers
Genoa C.F.C. managers
U.S. Lecce managers
Catania S.S.D. managers
Calcio Padova managers
Cosenza Calcio managers
Palermo F.C. managers
Venezia F.C. non-playing staff
Juventus F.C. non-playing staff
Queens Park Rangers F.C. non-playing staff
Serie A managers
Serie B managers
Italian footballers
Association footballers not categorized by position